Talunan-an (variously Tulunaun, Talunanaun, or Tulunanaun) is a small island in northeastern Iloilo, Philippines. It is one of fourteen islands politically administered by the municipality of Carles.

Location and geography 

Talunan-an is a narrow island northeast of the Panay Island coast in the Visayan Sea.

See also 

 List of islands in the Philippines

References 

Islands of Iloilo